Hopewell Township is one of the fifteen townships of Seneca County, Ohio, United States.  The 2010 census found 2,774 people in the township.

Geography
Located in the west central part of the county, it borders the following townships:
Liberty Township - north
Pleasant Township - northeast corner
Clinton Township - east
Eden Township - southeast corner
Seneca Township - south
Big Spring Township - southwest corner
Loudon Township - west
Jackson Township - northwest corner

Part of the city of Tiffin, the county seat of Seneca County, is located in eastern Hopewell Township, and the unincorporated community of Bascom lies in the western part of the township.

Name and history
Hopewell Township was organized in 1824.

It is one of five Hopewell Townships statewide.

Government
The township is governed by a three-member board of trustees, who are elected in November of odd-numbered years to a four-year term beginning on the following January 1. Two are elected in the year after the presidential election and one is elected in the year before it. There is also an elected township fiscal officer, who serves a four-year term beginning on April 1 of the year after the election, which is held in November of the year before the presidential election. Vacancies in the fiscal officership or on the board of trustees are filled by the remaining trustees.

References

External links
County website

Townships in Seneca County, Ohio
Townships in Ohio